Davis v Alexander, 269 U.S. 114 (1925), is a US corporate law case, concerning the duties of parent corporations for actions of subsidiaries.

Facts
Cattle were negligently injured while being transported from New Mexico to Oklahoma City.

Judgment
The Supreme Court held the federal government was liable for torts of a railroad subsidiary.

Justice Brandeis, writing for a unanimous court, said the following:

See also

US corporate law

References

External links
 

1925 in United States case law
United States Supreme Court cases
United States Supreme Court cases of the Taft Court
United States corporate case law